"Movies" is a song by British indie rock band, Circa Waves, from their third studio album What's It Like Over There? (2019).

The single premiered on 27 November 2018, with a lyric video released on the band's YouTube channel. On 10 January 2019, Circa Waves released a corresponding music video. The song charted Belgium's Ultratop charts, peaking at number 11 in the Walloon Ultratop chart and 39 in the Flemish Ultratop chart. It was their first single since "T-Shirt Weather" to chart.

Background and composition 
The single was released with the announcement of their third studio album, What's It Like Over There? It was further announced that Alan Moulder would return as the producer for the album and the single.

Charts

References 

2018 singles
2019 songs
Circa Waves songs
PIAS Recordings singles
Song recordings produced by Alan Moulder